Norton-le-Clay is a village and civil parish in the Harrogate district of North Yorkshire, England. It is one of the Thankful Villages that suffered no fatalities during the Great War of 1914 to 1918.

References

External links

Villages in North Yorkshire
Civil parishes in North Yorkshire